The National Lottery: In It to Win It is a BBC game show that began airing in 2002.

In It to Win It may also refer to:

 In It to Win It (City Lights album), 2011
 In It to Win It (Saliva album), 2013
 In It to Win It (Charlie Wilson album), 2017
 Bring It On: In It to Win It, a 2007 teen comedy film

See also
Minute to Win It, a game show franchise